Solute carrier family 22 member 9 is a protein that in humans is encoded by the SLC22A9 gene.

See also

References

Further reading

Solute carrier family